Ian Jaryd Silverman (born 1995) is an American swimmer from Baltimore, Maryland. He has mild cerebral palsy and won a gold medal in the S10 400 m freestyle at the 2012 Summer Paralympics in London. At the Pan Pacific Para-Swimming Championships in 2014, Silverman broke the S10 world record in the event, with a time of 4:03.57 , Silverman also holds para-swimming world record in the 400 m Individual Medley.

Silverman now swims at NCAA Division I college University of Southern California.

Silverman did not compete at the 2015 IPC Swimming World Championships, after a classification review deemed him not impaired enough to compete in his preferred events.

References

Paralympic swimmers of the United States
Paralympic gold medalists for the United States
Swimmers at the 2012 Summer Paralympics
Living people
Medalists at the 2012 Summer Paralympics
USC Trojans men's swimmers
World record holders in paralympic swimming
S10-classified Paralympic swimmers
1995 births
Medalists at the World Para Swimming Championships
Paralympic medalists in swimming
American male freestyle swimmers
American male medley swimmers
21st-century American people